Gosforth Junior High Academy, formerly known as Gosforth West Middle School is a middle school in Gosforth, Newcastle upon Tyne, England.  It is the Junior School of Gosforth Academy.

It is one of three middle schools where students usually transfer to Gosforth Academy. The school is in the West Gosforth electoral ward. It is one of Newcastle's "Special Educational Needs" centres for Visual Impairment, along with Regent Farm First School and Gosforth Academy.

History

1937–2005 

The school started in 1937, as Gosforth Senior Council School, with separate Boys and Girls Departments.

The school changed into a Secondary Modern School in 1944, due to the Education Act 1944. The school name became Gosforth County Modern School / Gosforth County Secondary School.

The school became Gosforth West Middle School, when Northumberland County Council changed to the Three-tier education system in 1973.

2005–present 
By March 2005, Gosforth West was experiencing some problems and was placed under "Special Measures" by Ofsted. In July 2006 the school had vastly improved and was removed from special measures.

In September 2005, Kathryn Thomas (seconded from Gosforth High School) became the schools Acting Headteacher, replacing Paul Hugall. David Sheppard (also seconded from Gosforth High School) became Assistant Headteacher.

In September 2006, Gosforth High took over the administration duties of Gosforth West Middle School, in a Federation style agreement. The federation came into action on 1 January 2007. Gosforth West was also renamed as Gosforth Junior High School after the Easter break. The uniform was set to change in September 2007, this included the removal of the tie from the uniform. The PRAISE Code which was introduced at the High School is also in practice at the Junior High School.
In March 2009 planning applications to create a new school building were accepted, and later that year building work commenced.

By 2011 the school had become an Academy along with the High School, now Gosforth Academy.

Facilities 

As of 2011 Gosforth Junior High is using a new building; this followed East and Central's moves to new facilities. Previously the school had been using the 1930s building as well as some temporary buildings, and the new building was a part of the "Building Schools for the Future" Initiative. A new building is currently being developed.

Gosforth Junior High had concrete tennis courts, until in around 2003 the area of land on which it was situated, was used for an additional building for Archibald First School.

On 6 June 2007, David Bellamy opened the school's re-built wildlife garden, in one of the buildings' quadrangles, which has had contributions from local organisations, such as Northern Rock, The Gosforth Round Table and the school's pupils.

New buildings 
A planning application which was submitted on 18 December 2008 by AURA Ltd, a local education partnership company in which the council has a 10% share, was conditionally granted on 20 March 2009. This application was for the "Erection of two-storey school (Class D1) with associated outdoor play areas and 2 hard surfaced games courts, 114 space car park with access and egress onto Regent Avenue, covered cycle parking, pedestrian access onto Jubilee Road and hard and soft landscaping". Building work began in November 2009 and the new school buildings were in use by September 2011.

Ofsted report 2008 
Gosforth Junior High was inspected by Ofsted in June 2008, and they remarked that it "is a good and improving school with outstanding features." Other remarks Ofsted had were "The outstanding leadership of the federation, principal and senior managers is continuing to steer the school in the right direction." and The quality of teaching and learning is good and some is outstanding."

Results 
The KS2 SATs results score by year are listed below:

Notable alumnus

Gosforth West Middle School 
 Michael Chopra, centre forward for Ipswich Town F.C.

Feeder schools 
 Archibald First School
 Regent Farm First School
 Brunton Park First School

See also 
 Gosforth
 Gosforth Academy
 Gosforth East Middle School

References

External links 
 
 Gosforth Academy
 Gosforth Junior High School Information at Newcastle City Council
 Gosforth Junior High School at BBC League Tables

Educational institutions established in 1937
Middle schools in Newcastle upon Tyne
Academies in Newcastle upon Tyne
1937 establishments in England